Enzo Tortora (30 November 1928 – 18 May 1988) was an Italian TV host on national RAI television, who was unjustly convicted of being a member of the Camorra and drug trafficking in 1985, and sentenced to 10 years in jail. He was acquitted of all charges by the Cassation Court in 1987.

Early career

Tortora was born in Genoa, Italy. After taking a degree in journalism in his native city, he worked in theatre with Paolo Villaggio before joining the RAI – Italy's state radio and television corporation – as a radio announcer. In 1956, he first appeared on television and presented programmes such as Domenica Sportiva and Giochi senza frontiere. In 1969, he was fired by RAI when he described the company's managers as a group of boy scouts trying to pilot a supersonic jet plane unsuccessfully. Subsequently, he worked for several private TV stations and various newspapers, before returning to RAI in 1977.

During the 1970s Enzo Tortora was the co-founder of Telebiella, the first Italian free TV station that broke the state monopoly of TV broadcasting, and later of Telealtomilanese and Antenna 3 Lombardia.

In 1977, Tortora started to present a programme called Portobello, which attracted an audience of up to 26 million people every Friday night, far outperforming any other programme. Named after the Portobello Road market in London, the show allowed the audience, via telephone from home, to buy or sell things, present ideas or inventions, or look for a partner or someone they had not seen for years. The challenge for those participating in the studio was to get Portobello, the green parrot and mascot of the show, to say his name.

Arrest and conviction

On 17 June 1983, he was arrested and held in jail for 7 months after fake allegations by several pentiti of the Nuova Camorra Organizzata, such as Pasquale Barra, Giovanni Pandico and Giovanni Melluso. It was claimed that this was most likely a wrong identification with a man bearing the same surname, but the pentiti continued to accuse Tortora of offences related to cocaine dealing.

He was sentenced to ten years in jail in his first trial held in 1985, being spared further incarceration only thanks to the providential intervention of the Radical Party who offered him a candidacy to the European Parliament, which Tortora won in a landslide as the country divided between those who held him guilty and those who held him innocent.

Rehabilitation
In September 1986, the Court of Appeal of Naples fully acquitted Tortora. In 1987 the Supreme Court definitively affirmed Tortora's total innocence, and he started an action against those magistrates who had unjustly tried and sentenced him.

After four years, he returned to television, hosting his Portobello show in February 1987. Tortora began the show saying "Well then, where did we leave off?" (Dove eravamo rimasti?) He developed cancer and died in May 1988.

See also
List of miscarriage of justice cases

References

1928 births
1988 deaths
Mass media people from Genoa
Italian television personalities
Italian male journalists
Italian prisoners and detainees
Prisoners and detainees of Italy
Radical Party (Italy) MEPs
MEPs for Italy 1984–1989
History of the Camorra in Italy
Overturned convictions in Italy
20th-century Italian journalists
Politicians from Genoa
20th-century Italian male writers